Kelvin Giacobe Alves dos Santos (born 18 August 1997), simply known as Kelvin, is a Brazilian footballer who plays as a forward for Atlético Goianiense.

Club career
Born in Ibarama, Rio Grande do Sul, Kelvin made his senior debut with Esportivo before being loaned to the under-20 side of Grêmio on 11 August 2015. Upon returning, he subsequently moved to São José-RS, initially playing in the youth sides before establishing himself as a first team regular.

In December 2018, Kelvin joined Novo Hamburgo ahead of the ensuing campaign. The following 12 April, he signed for Botafogo-PB for the Série C.

Kelvin moved to XV de Piracicaba on 3 September 2020, reuniting with former Botafogo manager Evaristo Piza. On 13 October, he returned to former side São José.

On 29 April 2021, Kelvin agreed to a deal with Rio Claro, but moved to Caxias on 3 June. On 2 December, he was announced at ABC.

On 9 June 2022, ABC president confirmed the transfer of Kelvin to Série A side Atlético Goianiense, with the deal being effective on 18 July. He made his debut in the category on 21 July, coming on as a half-time substitute for Luiz Fernando and scoring his team's only in a 4–1 away loss against Athletico Paranaense.

Career statistics

Honours
São José-RS
Copa FGF: 2017

ABC
Campeonato Potiguar: 2022

References

1997 births
Living people
Sportspeople from Rio Grande do Sul
Brazilian footballers
Association football forwards
Campeonato Brasileiro Série A players
Campeonato Brasileiro Série B players
Campeonato Brasileiro Série C players
Campeonato Brasileiro Série D players
Clube Esportivo Bento Gonçalves players
Esporte Clube São José players
Esporte Clube Novo Hamburgo players
Botafogo Futebol Clube (PB) players
Esporte Clube XV de Novembro (Piracicaba) players
Rio Claro Futebol Clube players
Sociedade Esportiva e Recreativa Caxias do Sul players
ABC Futebol Clube players
Atlético Clube Goianiense players